The GS-5 was a class of streamlined 4-8-4 "Northern" type steam locomotive operated by the Southern Pacific Railroad (SP) from 1942 to 1958.  A total of two were built by the Lima Locomotive Works, numbered 4458 and 4459.  GS stands for "Golden State" or "General Service."

History
The GS-5s were identical in appearance to the GS-4s, the only difference being the roller bearings that gave the locomotive a smoother ride and added weight. No. 4458 had roller bearings from the Timken Company and No. 4459 used SKF brand roller bearings.  They had a silver smokebox with a dual-headlight casing (the top headlight was a mars light), and an enclosed, all-weather cab. It retained the skyline casing on the top of the boiler, skirting on the sides, an air horn (for use at speeds due to being louder than the whistle which was rarely if ever used on the main line), and teardrop classification lights. They received the orange and red "Daylight" paint scheme. The GS-5's were designed for high-speed passenger service on Southern Pacific's premier passenger trains, the Coast Daylight, San Joaquin Daylight, and the Sunset Limited. In later years they were painted black and had their side skirting removed for easier maintenance. The GS-5s were considered the pinnacle of the GS series and ended their careers on Southern Pacific's San Joaquin Valley line, pulling the ever popular San Joaquin Daylight until late 1956.

The roller bearings on the two GS-5s were so successful that when both No. 4458 and No. 4459 were scrapped, they were examined and showed minimal wear.

Preservation
Neither of the two GS-5s survive after running well over a million miles. Surviving GS-4 No. 4449 was equipped with roller bearings on the lead truck, trailing truck, and tender (but not the main axles or rods) in 2008, and therefore shares some of the same characteristics as a GS-5.

References

External links

 Southern Pacific Coast Daylight Engines
 GS-5 SP #4458, Live Steam Accu-Craft Model Trains

GS-5
4-8-4 locomotives
Lima locomotives
Streamlined steam locomotives
Passenger locomotives
Railway locomotives introduced in 1942
Steam locomotives of the United States
Scrapped locomotives
Standard gauge locomotives of the United States